Yugoslavia was present at the Eurovision Song Contest 1981, held in Dublin, Ireland, after last participating at the Eurovision Song Contest 1976 contest in The Hague, Netherlands.

Before Eurovision

Jugovizija 1981 
After a four-year break, Yugoslavia returned to the Eurovision Song Contest in 1981.

The Yugoslav national final to select their entry, Jugovizija 1981, was held on 28 February at the Belgrade TV Studios, and was hosted by Minja Subota and Helga Vlahović.

Sixteen songs made it to the national final, which was broadcast by JRT to all of the regions of Yugoslavia. The winner was decided by the votes of eight regional juries (Sarajevo, Skopje, Novi Sad, Titograd, Zagreb, Belgrade, Ljubljana and Pristina).

The winning entry was "Lejla", performed by Bosnian singer Seid Memić Vajta and composed by Ranko Boban.

At Eurovision
Yugoslavia performed 7th on the night of the contest, following Denmark and preceding Finland. At the close of voting it had received 35 points, placing 15th out of 20 contestants. The Yugoslav jury awarded its 12 points to Switzerland.

Voting

References

1981
Countries in the Eurovision Song Contest 1981
Eurovision